

Mount Indefatigable is a  mountain summit located in Peter Lougheed Provincial Park in the Canadian Rockies of Alberta, Canada. The peak is visible from Alberta Highway 40, and the Kananaskis Lakes area. Mount Indefatigable's nearest higher neighbor is Mount Invincible,  to the northwest.

Like so many of the mountains in Kananaskis Country, Mount Indefatigable received its name from the persons and ships involved in the 1916 Battle of Jutland, the only major sea battle of the First World War.

History

The first ascent of the peak was made in 1901 by Walter D. Wilcox.

In 2005, the popular trail to the summit of Mount Indefatigable was decommissioned to protect prime grizzly bear habitat. Though the unmaintained trail still exists, travel is discouraged by Alberta Parks.

Geology

Mount Indefatigable is composed of sedimentary rock laid down during the Precambrian to Jurassic periods. Formed in shallow seas, this sedimentary rock was pushed east and over the top of younger rock during the Laramide orogeny.

Climate

Based on the Köppen climate classification, Mount Indefatigable is located in a subarctic climate with cold, snowy winters, and mild summers. Temperatures can drop below −20 °C with wind chill factors below −30 °C. Precipitation runoff from the mountain drains east into the Kananaskis River, thence into the Bow River.

See also
 List of mountains in the Canadian Rockies
 Geography of Alberta

References

Gallery

External links
 Mount Indefatigable weather: Mountain Forecast

Two-thousanders of Alberta
Canadian Rockies
Alberta's Rockies